Emil Johann Rudolf Frey (24 October 1838 – 24 December 1922) was a Swiss politician, Union Army soldier in the American Civil War and member of the Swiss Federal Council (1890–1897). He served as President of the Swiss Confederation in 1894.

Early life
Frey was born in Arlesheim, in the Canton of Basel-Landschaft, to Emil Remigius Frey and Emma Kloss. His father was a liberal separatist politician.

Frey's family provided refuge for Friedrich Hecker when he fled the repression following the revolution in Germany in 1848. After attending gymnasium in Basel, Frey went to study in an agronomical institute in Jena. In 1860 he emigrated to the United States, arriving in Belleville, Illinois, an area with many Forty-Eighters, veterans of the 1848 revolutions in Europe. For a while he worked for Hecker, but they had a falling-out.

Military career

American Civil War 

Frey enlisted in the Union Army's 24th Illinois Infantry Regiment as a private. He wrote in his essay "My American Experiences" that "on 17th of June [1861] I enlisted in the 24th at Chicago. On that same day I was appointed by Colonel Hecker to be the colorbearer of the regiment, and in the evening we left Chicago for Alton, Ill." Hecker was his commander, and they became friends again, with Frey sharing a tent with Hecker's son. Frey was later promoted to first lieutenant but resigned on 17 June 1862.

Frey raised the 82nd Illinois Infantry Regiment (known as "Second Hecker Regiment") and was the regiment's acting colonel at the Battle of Gettysburg in July 1863. He was taken prisoner on the first day of the Battle of Gettysburg, and following held in Libby Prison for eighteen months before being exchanged for Captain Gordon, a Confederate prisoner who had been sentenced to death. Frey held the rank of major at the end of the war . He rescinded his Swiss citizenship on the 14th July 1864, and took on the American.

Swiss Army 
He didn't count with the mandatory military service in Switzerland, but on his return from the United States, in view of his experience from the American civil war, he was made a major of the Swiss Army from the beginning. When he assumed as a Federal Councillor, he had the rank of a Colonel.

Political career
After the Civil War, Frey returned to Switzerland. From 1866 to 1872, he was a member of the cantonal government of Basel-Country. Not satisfied with the salary as politician he shortly was an editor for the journal Basler Nachrichten in 1872. The same year, Frey was elected to the Swiss National Council, council he presided in 1875/1876.

From 1882 to 1888, Frey was the first ambassador (Minister) of Switzerland to the United States in Washington. The US President Chester A. Arthur saw him as the representative for both states. During his tenure as ambassador, he always stayed the summers in Arlesheim, his hometown.

He was elected to the Federal Council of Switzerland on 11 December 1890 and handed over office on 31 March 1897. He was affiliated to the Free Democratic Party. During his office time he held the Military Department. During his tenure he tried to introduce a military reform, but in a referendum the people voted against it. He was confirmed as a Federal Councillor in December 1896, but he resigned from office in 1897.

He was President of the Confederation in 1894.

International Telegraph Union

In 1897, following his retirement from his second period as a member of Switzerland’s National Council, Frey was nominated as Director of the ITU Bureau at the ITU Plenipotentiary Conference to replace Timotheus Rothen. He held the post for almost a quarter of a century and took part in the International Telegraph Conferences of 1903 in London and 1908 Lisbon.  

After leaving ITU in August 1921, Frey died, two months after his eighty-fifth birthday, on Christmas Eve 1922.

Personal life 
In 1870, he married Emma Kloss (born 1848) from Liestal, with whom he had five children: Hans (1871–1913), Emil (1872–1913), Carl (1873–1934), Anna (1874–1893) and Helene (1876–1944). In 1877 Emma died from pulmonary tuberculosis, aged just 28 years.

Literary works 
 Aus den Erlebnissen eines Schweizers im Sezessionskriege, Bern 1893, (translated: "From the experiences of a Swiss in the War of Secession")
 Die Kriegstaten der Schweizer, dem Volk erzählt, Neuchâtel 1905, (translated: "The Swiss Acts of War, told to the People")

See also

References

External links

Personenlexikon des Kantons Basel-Landschaft 
Emil Frey - der Baselbieter Bundesrat 

Archiv der Basler Familie Frey - Family archives in Basel 

1838 births
1922 deaths
People from Basel-Landschaft
Swiss Calvinist and Reformed Christians
Free Democratic Party of Switzerland politicians
Members of the Federal Council (Switzerland)
Members of the National Council (Switzerland)
Presidents of the National Council (Switzerland)
Ambassadors of Switzerland to the United States
Arlesheim
Swiss military officers
Union Army officers
American Civil War prisoners of war
People of Illinois in the American Civil War
19th-century Swiss military personnel
International Telecommunication Union people